Fernando Navarro may refer to:

 Fernando Navarro (Spanish footballer) (born 1982), Spanish football left-back
 Fernando Navarro (Mexican footballer) (born 1989), Mexican football right-back